Eduard Nunatak, Oscar II Coast
 Egerika Range, Danco Coast
 Elemag Reef, Livingston Island  
 Elena Peak, Livingston Island  
 Elhovo Gap, Livingston Island  
 Elin Pelin Point, Smith Island  
 Eliseyna Cove, Livingston Island  
 Elovdol Glacier, Oscar II Coast
 Elysian Beach, Snow Island
 Emen Island, Anvers Island
 Emona Anchorage, Livingston Island 
 Enitsa Peak, Sentinel Range 
 Enravota Glacier, Nordenskjöld Coast
 Enrique Hill, Livingston Island 
 Eratosthenes Point, Elephant Island
 Erden Glacier, Oscar II Coast 
 Eremiya Hill, Trinity Peninsula 
 Ereta Peak, Bastien Range 
 Erma Knoll, Livingston Island 
 Erovete Peak, Loubet Coast 
 Erul Heights, Trinity Peninsula  
 Eridanus Stream, Livingston Island
 Esperanto Island, Zed Islands  
 Etar Snowfield, Livingston Island  
 Etropole Peak, Livingston Island  
 Eurydice Peninsula, Danco Coast
 Evlogi Peak, Smith Island  
 Eyer Peak, Sentinel Range
 Ezdimir Buttress, Davis Coast
 Ezerets Knoll, Graham Coast

See also 
 Bulgarian toponyms in Antarctica

External links 
 Bulgarian Antarctic Gazetteer
 SCAR Composite Gazetteer of Antarctica
 Antarctic Digital Database (ADD). Scale 1:250000 topographic map of Antarctica with place-name search.
 L. Ivanov. Bulgarian toponymic presence in Antarctica. Polar Week at the National Museum of Natural History in Sofia, 2–6 December 2019

Bibliography 
 J. Stewart. Antarctica: An Encyclopedia. Jefferson, N.C. and London: McFarland, 2011. 1771 pp.  
 L. Ivanov. Bulgarian Names in Antarctica. Sofia: Manfred Wörner Foundation, 2021. Second edition. 539 pp.  (in Bulgarian)
 G. Bakardzhieva. Bulgarian toponyms in Antarctica. Paisiy Hilendarski University of Plovdiv: Research Papers. Vol. 56, Book 1, Part A, 2018 – Languages and Literature, pp. 104-119 (in Bulgarian)
 L. Ivanov and N. Ivanova. Bulgarian names. In: The World of Antarctica. Generis Publishing, 2022. pp. 114-115. 

Antarctica
 
Bulgarian toponyms in Antarctica
Names of places in Antarctica